I Found You may refer to:
"I Found You" (Benny Blanco and Calvin Harris song), 2018
"I Found You" (The Wanted song), 2012
"I Found You", song by Alabama Shakes from Boys & Girls
"I Found You", song by Tilly and the Wall from O
"I Found You", song by LA Guns from album Hollywood Vampires
"I Found You", song by Blues Image,	Gary Dunham	1975
"I Found You", song by The Fixx, 1982
"I Found You", song by Frankie Laine, Craig Evans	1968
"I Found You", song by Gene Clark from the album Gene Clark with the Gosdin Brothers, 1967
"I Found You", song by Russ Hamilton (singer), Joe Lubin	1959
"I Found You", song by Wally Cox, Cox  USA	 
"I Found You", song by Yvonne Fair And The James Brown Band	1962

"I Found U", song by Axwell featuring Max'C   2007

"I Found U" , song by Passion Pit and Galantis  2019